Bhola Tamang is a Bengali film actor. He mainly plays side role characters in films.

Filmography 
 Hoichoi Unlimited  (2018) 
 Loafer (Upcoming)
 Final Mission (2013)
 Panga Nibi Na Sala (2013)
 Misti Cheler Dustu Buddhi (2013)
 Antore Shudhu Tumi (2012)
 Buddhuram Dhol Duniya Gol (2012)
 Mahakash Kando (2012)
 Haatchhani (2012)
 Hridoye Lekho Naam (2012)
 Chaal - The Games Begins (2012)
 Mone Pore Aajo Seidin (2011)
 Hello Memsaheb (2011)
 Keloda in Kashmir (2011)
 Love Birds (2011)
 Ek Tukro Chand (2010)
 Preyashi (2010)
 Shudhu Tomar Jonyo (2007)
 Samayer Chhayaguli (2006)
 Nishachar (2005)
 Rakhe Hari Mare Ke (2003)
 Sangee (2003)
 Sajoni Aamar Sohag (2000)
 Dadabhai (1999)
 Shatru Mitra'' (1999)

References

Externarnal links 
 

Male actors in Bengali cinema
Living people
Year of birth missing (living people)
Place of birth missing (living people)
Tamang people